Gareeb Stephen Shalfoon (1904–1953) was a notable New Zealand  dance band musician, storekeeper and music shop proprietor. Of Māori descent, he identified with the Te Whakatohea iwi. He was born in Opotiki, Bay of Plenty, New Zealand in 1904.

His band the "Melody Boys" made the first jazz recording in New Zealand in 1930, on a short publicity film.

References

1904 births
1953 deaths
20th-century New Zealand musicians
New Zealand Māori musicians
Whakatōhea people
20th-century New Zealand businesspeople
People from Ōpōtiki